Dave Nehring is an American politician. He served as a Republican member for the 8th district of the North Dakota House of Representatives.

In 2020, Nehring won the election for the 8th district of the North Dakota House of Representatives. He succeeded Vernon R. Laning. Nehring assumed his office on December 1, 2020. He served as a candidate for the 8th district of the North Dakota Senate. Jeffery Magrum defeated Nehring in the republican primary election for which Magrum had 57.1 percent of votes and Nehring had 42.7 percent of votes.

References 

Living people
Year of birth missing (living people)
Place of birth missing (living people)
Republican Party members of the North Dakota House of Representatives
21st-century American politicians